Gladman is a surname. Notable people with the surname include:

Brett J. Gladman (born 1966), Canadian astronomer
Constance Helen Gladman (1922–1964), Australian Roman Catholic nun
Frederick John Gladman (1839–1884), Australian educator and writer
Ken Gladman (born 1946), Australian rules footballer
Malcolm Gladman (1915–1987), Australian politician
Marjorie Gladman (1908–1999), American tennis player
Renee Gladman (born 1971), American poet and writer
Rod Gladman (born 1968), Australian rules footballer

Gladman Mvukuzane ngubo
7638 Gladman, a main-belt asteroid